The Olivetti Envision (400/P75) was an Italian multimedia personal computer produced in 1995. It came with a choice of two processors: Intel 486 DX4 100 MHz or Intel Pentium P75. 

It had an infrared keyboard and internal modem, and it was compatible with audio CDs, CD-ROMs, Photo CDs and Video CDs. Preinstalled software allowed the computer to work as a fax or answering machine when connected to a telephone line.

The Envision had three possible operating modes:

 Simple (limited to the use of an infrared remote control to control the volume and the reproduction of photo, video or audio CDs); 
 Intermediate (a simplified Windows shell replacement called Olipilot that gave access to a limited set of programs);
 Advanced (standard Windows 95 graphical user interface).

Designed by M. De Lucchi, the declared goal for this device was to convince non-computer-savvy people that computers are not impossibly hard to use and can be bought and used like normal home appliances. For this reason, it was intentionally designed to resemble a videocassette recorder more than a computer, and it was equipped with two SCART sockets (to connect it to a TV set), a TV-like remote control, and a slot that could host a satellite TV decoder card.

The Olivetti Envision was discontinued in 1996 due to poor sales caused by its excessive price, many software bugs and limited expandability.

Technical specifications 

 CPU: Intel 486 DX4 @ 100 MHz or Intel Pentium @ 75 Mhz
 RAM: 8 MB
 Graphics: Trident TGV9470 (1 MB, integrated into the motherboard, compatible with Number Nine GXE Graphics Accelerator,  Infotronic IPG 64 and Spea Video 7 Mercury)
 Resolutions: 1024 x 768 with 256 colors (monitor), 800 x 600 with 64000 colors (TV)
 Audio: Crystal Semiconductor Corporation CS4231 + Oak Mozart OTI 605 (compatible with the MPC2 multimedia standard, Roland SCC-1 and Sound Blaster 16)
 Connectors: 3 expansion slots, 2 SCART, audio out, MIDI, VGA out, serial,  parallel, modem
 Storage: 1,4 MB 3,5” floppy disk;  635 MB hard disk ,  CD-ROM drive
 Keyboard: 83 keys infrared keyboard

References

External links
http://ultimateconsoledatabase.com/golden/olivetti_envision.htm
https://web.archive.org/web/20200322013225/https://members.ziggo.nl/wimwubs/Olivetti-Envision-P75/

Olivetti personal computers
Computer-related introductions in 1995